Leonard Termo (March 6, 1935 – October 30, 2012) was an American character actor whose numerous film and television roles included Fight Club, Johnny Dangerously, and Seinfeld.

Termo was born in Brooklyn, New York. He worked as a businessman in Manhattan's Garment District until he left the industry in the mid-1970s to pursue acting as a full-time profession. In a November 1983 New York magazine article profiling actor Mickey Rourke, Termo told the interviewer that he had given up much of his life to continue acting, saying he "left it all—my wife, my kid, my money, everything... I love acting. I'm broke. I sleep on a cot." Termo made his film debut in the 1983 movie Heart Like a Wheel.

Termo formed a long personal and professional friendship with Rourke during the 1980s after Rourke saw Termo performing at a theater in Los Angeles. The Hollywood Reporter described the duo as "constant companions" for years. Termo appeared in five of Rourke's films throughout the 1980s, beginning with The Pope of Greenwich Village in 1984. Rourke and Termo had appeared together in Year of the Dragon in 1985, Barfly in 1987, A Prayer for the Dying, also released in 1987, and Homeboy in 1988. Termo and Rourke were also set to co-star in a film on 1930s-era gangster Jack "Legs" Diamond (with Rourke as Diamond and Termo portraying Diamond's bodyguard), but the proposed Embassy Pictures movie was never made.

Termo's other 1980s film roles included The Cotton Club in 1984; Johnny Dangerously in 1984; and Turk 182 in 1985. His film career continued in the 1990s and 2000s with parts in Ruby in 1992; the Tim Burton film Ed Wood in 1994, in which he played a make-up artist; Lost Highway in 1997; Fight Club in 1999; and Ali in 2001.

His television credits included Wiseguy and Lois & Clark: The New Adventures of Superman. Termo appeared in the premiere episode of the comedy television series Seinfeld fifth season—in "The Mango", aired on September 16, 1993, Termo portrayed Joe, the owner of Joe's Fruits store, who bans both Kramer (Michael Richards) and Jerry (Jerry Seinfeld) from his store after Kramer criticizes one of his bad peaches.

Termo died in his sleep at his home in Santa Clarita, California, on October 30, 2012, at the age of 77. His death was confirmed by Termo's friend, actor Elias Koteas. On November 2, 2012, actor Matt Dillon dedicated an award he received at the Savannah Film Festival in honor of Termo, who was also a friend of Dillon's.

Partial filmography

Heart Like a Wheel (1983) as Good Joe
Dragster (1983) - Good Joe
The Pope of Greenwich Village (1984) - Fat Waldo
The Cotton Club (1984) - Danny
Johnny Dangerously (1984) - Tony Scarano
Turk 182 (1985) - Barricade Cop
Year of the Dragon (1985) - Angelo Rizzo
A Prayer for the Dying (1987) - Bonati
Barfly (1987) - Harry
Zits (1988) - KGB Chief
Bloodhounds of Broadway (1989) - Goodtime Nate Fishkin
Hider in the House (1989) - George / Exterminator
My Blue Heaven (1990)
Midnight Cabaret (1990) - Lt. McMurphy
Mobsters (1991) - Joe Palermo
29th Street (1991) - Dr. Puccini
Ruby (1992) - Tony Ana
Nowhere to Run (1993) - Bus Guard
Gettysburg (1993) - Cpl. George F. Estabrook
Ed Wood (1994) - Makeup Man Harry
Mojave Moon (1996) - Shorty
Lost Highway (1997) - Judge (voice)
Gone Fishin' (1997) - Vending Worker #1
Lover Girl (1997) - Mr. Johnny
Godzilla (1998) - Homeless Guy
Ballad of the Nightingale (1999) - Tony the Tank
Fight Club (1999) - Desk Sergeant
Family Tree (1999) - Vince
Blood Type (1999) - Chauffeur
Double Bang (2001) - Al Lucito
Ali (2001) - Madison Square Garden Reporter #1
Gods and Generals (2003) - Glazier Estabrook (uncredited) (final film role)

References

External links

2012 deaths
American male film actors
American male television actors
Male actors from Santa Clarita, California
People from Brooklyn
Year of birth uncertain
1935 births
American people of Italian descent